James Tocher Bain (26 February 1906 – 5 December 1988) was a pioneering Canadian engineer and also an inductee to Canada's Aviation Hall of Fame.

References 
 Oswald, Mary, They Led the Way, Wetaskiwin: Canada's Aviation Hall of Fame, 1999.

External links 
 Hall of Fame site

20th-century Canadian engineers
1906 births
1988 deaths
Engineers from Edinburgh
Air Canada
Aviation history of Canada
People from the United Counties of Stormont, Dundas and Glengarry
Canadian aerospace engineers
Scottish emigrants to Canada